Bluebird is a 2004 Dutch television film directed by Mijke de Jong. It is the first in a trilogy of films made by de Jong about young women becoming adults.

Plot
Merel (Elske Rotteveel) is a 13 year old girl living in Rotterdam and looking after her younger disabled brother. She is successful at school, but hounded by a group of a classmates. As the bullying intensifies, Merel finds it hard to talk about it and her behaviour changes.

Accolades
Bluebird won a Crystal Bear award at the Berlin International Film Festival. The film was selected by the Netherlands as its official Foreign Language Film submission for the 78th Academy Awards, but was rejected by the Academy of Motion Picture Arts and Sciences because it had been shown on television. The film also won the Youth Jury Award at the Toronto Sprockets International Film Festival for Children and the Grand prix de Montréal at the Montréal International Children’s Film Festival.

In 2008, VPRO rated it as de Jong's best film and stated it demonstrated her skill as a director.

References

External links
 

2004 television films
2004 films
2004 drama films
Dutch drama films
Films directed by Mijke de Jong